Amara armeniaca is a species of beetle in the family Carabidae. It is found in East Europe and further east in the Palearctic realm.

References 

armeniaca
Beetles of Asia
Beetles of Europe
Beetles described in 1839
Taxa named by Victor Motschulsky